Dawn of the Dead is a 2004 American action horror film directed by Zack Snyder in his directorial debut, with a screenplay by James Gunn. A remake of George A. Romero's 1978 horror film of the same name, it stars an ensemble cast that includes Sarah Polley, Ving Rhames, Jake Weber, and Mekhi Phifer. Scott Reiniger, Tom Savini, and Ken Foree from the original film also make cameo appearances. Set in Milwaukee, the film follows a group of survivors who take refuge in an upscale suburban shopping mall during a zombie apocalypse.

Producers Eric Newman and Marc Abraham developed the film rather as a "re-envisioning" of the original Dawn of the Dead, aiming to reinvigorate the zombie genre for modern audiences. Newman and Abraham bought the rights from co-producer Richard P. Rubinstein (who produced the original), and hired Gunn to write the script, which adopted the original's basic premise but is oriented around the action genre. Intent on making the remake a straight horror, Snyder took over to direct with the goal of keeping every aspect of the production as grounded in reality as possible. Filming took place from June 9 to September 6 of 2003, on location in Toronto, Ontario, Canada where a now-defunct shopping mall that was slated for demolition was used. The special makeup effects for the film were created by David LeRoy Anderson, and the music was composed by Tyler Bates in his first collaboration with Snyder. 

The film was released on March 19, 2004, by Universal Pictures; it topped the box office in its United States opening weekend, and ended its theatrical run grossing $102.3 million worldwide against a budget of $26 million. Reviews were generally favorable, citing improvements over the original in terms of acting, production values, and scares while finding it lacking in character development, excessively gory, and indifferent to Romero's preoccupation with consumerism. Retrospective reviews have called Dawn of the Dead Snyder's best film and placed it among the best zombie and horror films ever made. A spiritual successor, Army of the Dead, was released on May 14, 2021.

Plot

After finishing a long shift as a nurse, Ana returns to her suburban neighborhood and her husband, Luis. Caught up in a scheduled date night, they miss an emergency news bulletin. The next morning, a neighborhood girl enters their bedroom and kills Luis, who immediately reanimates as a zombie and attacks Ana. She flees in her car, crashes, and passes out. Upon waking, Ana joins police sergeant Kenneth Hall, electronics salesman Michael, petty criminal Andre and his pregnant wife, Luda. They break into a nearby mall and are attacked by a zombified security guard, who scratches Luda. Three living guards — C.J., Bart, and Terry — make them surrender their weapons in exchange for refuge. They split into groups to secure the mall. On the roof, they see another survivor, Andy, who is stranded in his gun store across the zombie-infested parking lot.

The next day, a delivery truck carrying more survivors enters the lot, pursued by zombies. C.J. and Bart wish to turn them away but are overruled and disarmed. The newcomers include Norma, Steve Marcus, Tucker, Monica, Glen, Frank and his daughter, Nicole. Another woman is too ill to walk; she is wheeled inside via wheelbarrow, only to die and reanimate. After she is killed, the group determines the disease is passed by bites. Andre leaves to see Luda, who has kept her scratch hidden from the group. They realize that Frank has been bitten and is a potential threat. After some debate, Frank elects to be isolated.  When he dies and turns, Kenneth shoots him.

Kenneth and Andy start a friendship by way of messages written on a whiteboard; romance also buds between Ana and Michael, and Nicole and Terry. When the power goes out, CJ, Bart, Michael and Kenneth go to the parking garage to activate the emergency generator; they find a friendly dog and worry about a breach. Zombies attack and kill Bart, forcing the others to douse the zombies in gas and set them ablaze. Meanwhile, Luda — tied up by Andre — gives birth and dies. She reanimates as Norma checks on the couple. When Norma kills the zombified Luda, Andre snaps; they exchange gunfire and both are killed. The others arrive to find a zombie baby, which they kill immediately. The group decides to fight their way to the local marina and travel on Steve's yacht to an island on Lake Michigan. They reinforce two shuttle buses from the parking garage for their escape.

To rescue Andy, the group straps supplies onto the dog, Chips, and lower him into the parking lot; the zombies have no interest in him. Chips enters Andy's store safely, but a zombie follows through the dog door. Nicole, fond of Chips, crashes the delivery truck into the gun store, where she is trapped by a zombified Andy. Kenneth, Michael, Tucker, Terry, and C.J. reach the gun store via the sewers, kill Andy, and rescue Nicole. They grab ammunition and go back to the mall; along the way, Tucker breaks his legs, and C.J shoots him out of mercy. Once inside, they are unable to lock the door, forcing an evacuation via the buses.

While navigating through the city, Glen loses control of a chainsaw, accidentally killing himself and Monica; blood splatters on the windshield, causing their bus to crash. While C.J., Kenneth, and Terry look for survivors, Ana kills the zombified Steve and retrieves his boat keys. At the marina, C.J sacrifices himself so the others can escape. Michael reveals a bite wound, killing himself as Ana, Kenneth, Nicole, Terry, and Chips flee on the yacht. Footage from a camcorder found on the boat shows Steve's escapades before the outbreak and concludes as the group runs out of supplies, arrives at an island, and is attacked by a swarm of zombies. The camcorder drops, leaving their fate unknown.

Cast

Additional members of the cast include stuntman Ermes Blarasin as the bloated woman, Natalie Brown as a CDC reporter, and dog actor Blu as Nicole's adopted pet dog Chips. Director Zack Snyder cameos as a soldier battling zombies at the United States Capitol during the film's title sequence, as do Scott Reiniger, Tom Savini, and Ken Foree (who were in the original film) as a general, sheriff, and televangelist, respectively.

Production

Development
Plans to remake 1978's Dawn of the Dead were conceived by producer Eric Newman, a fan of zombie films who cited the George A. Romero horror film as the best in this genre. With the remake, Newman and producer Marc Abraham wanted to reinvigorate the zombie genre for modern audiences as well as "make the old fans happy and make a lot of new fans". Newman and Abraham bought the rights to Dawn of the Dead from its producer and rights holder Richard P. Rubinstein, who was reluctant at first as he was "concerned that somewhere along the way a studio would sanitize Newman's vision for producing a version with 'attitude'", but that it was "Marc Abraham's long track record in keeping the creative integrity of the studio distributed films he has produced intact that gave me reason to say 'yes'". Newman hired James Gunn to write the script, and the studio  brought Gunn in despite not wanting to deliver them a signal idea for the film beforehand. Gunn, who had been a fan of the original since he was a young boy, had turned down the offer until he "kind of saw generally what [the film] could be". 

The producers conceptualized the remake as more of a "re-envisioning" which would work in some references to the original but would primarily work on its own terms. Co-producer Eric Newman cited Invasion of the Body Snatchers (1978), The Thing (1982), and The Fly (1986) as influences on the remake, considering these to be "amazing updates" as well as "great movies that add to rather than diminish the original films". By way of respect to Romero's film, the producers cast the original's Tom Savini, Scott Reiniger, and Ken Foree in cameos; and incorporated visual references to Gaylen Ross and James A. Baffico. 

In writing the script, Gunn retained the original's basic premise of a group of survivors taking refuge in a mall during the zombie apocalypse, but gave it a plot that was more action-oriented. To develop the plot, he declined to write a treatment in favor of a discovery writing method whereby he would devise hypothetical situations which would ultimately force the characters to evacuate the mall. He chose to leave the origin of the zombie outbreak ambiguous to encourage diverse viewpoints, scientific or otherwise, on how it really came about and reflect upon those accordingly. The script was given uncredited rewrites by Michael Tolkin and Scott Frank; co-producer Richard P. Rubinstein said Tolkin further developed the characters while Frank provided some of the bigger, upbeat action scenes. Gunn revealed he had received internet backlash over the film due to his past screenwriting credit on Scooby-Doo (2002), believing him to be unqualified for the job. However, film critic Harry Knowles, initially an opponent of the remake, read Gunn's script and gave it a positive response on his website Ain't It Cool News, which Gunn said helped eliminate doubts cast upon him by fans of the original.

Theme
With Dawn of the Dead, Gunn wanted to explore the human condition as well as tell a wholly different story about redemption. He elaborated on the redemptive theme of the film in an interview with IGN during a press junket for Scooby-Doo 2: Monsters Unleashed released that same year:

I think that in the end, Dawn of the Dead is about redemption because it's about a bunch of people who have lived certain lives, who have maybe not been the best people, and suddenly they have everything that they've used to define themselves: Their careers, their churches, their jobs, their families are stripped away. They're gone. They start at nothing and they have to become who they really are in the face of all that and some of the people are redeemed and end up becoming good people and some of them are not redeemed and they end up, you know, not redeemed. And that's what kind of drove me throughout the story, was it was a story about redemption. I also think that there's a lot about how people survive and what people turn to in the face of such tragedy. The tragedy in this case being flesh-eating zombies. And really it's a group coming together to work as a community who wouldn't otherwise work together. So there is that foundation of love, that basic message, within even Dawn of the Dead...

Pre-production

Zack Snyder chose to direct the remake as his first feature film because it gave the television commercial director "a reason to care about every shot". Not wanting his version inevitably compared to George A. Romero's, he concurred with the producers on reimagining the latter film as opposed to doing it as a "remake", which, in his view, would have entailed re-shooting Romero's script. For that matter, he aimed to make his film a straight horror that was "as serious as a heart attack" and keep every aspect of its production as grounded in reality as possible. His approach included previsualizing the film with storyboards and introducing the concept of running zombies, which he said was his "fresh, new way" of giving it a sense of verisimilitude and rendering zombies as if they were real threats, especially when they attack in hordes. Gunn supported this concept, believing that the danger presented by running zombies would increase the stakes much higher than it would with lumbering zombies like those in the original. Snyder would also maintain Gunn's decision not to reveal the origin of the zombie outbreak, believing it was "obvious that in this fallen society, you wouldn't know where the whole plague started".

Set design
In searching for a suitable upscale mall location for the film, production designer Andrew Neskoromny looked for existing malls that were scheduled for demolition. Dubbed the "Crossroads Mall", the crew completely redid the mall over an eight-week period, adding an expensive water feature near the entrance, 14 stores, parking structures, and warehouse areas. Since Snyder wanted the stores palpable in terms of design and stood not merely as storefronts, Neskoromny's team accordingly built them as actual retail stores complete with merchandise. These stores were given fake names, since only two major retail brands agreed to be featured in the film.

Makeup effects
The special makeup effects for the film were created by David LeRoy Anderson, with assistance from his actress wife Heather Langenkamp. Prior to accepting the job from Universal Studios' then-executive James D. Brubaker, Anderson had been in a two-year hiatus from working as a makeup effects artist to operate his company DLA Silverwear. Anderson completed his test makeups for the film over a four-week period, and then he and his team traveled to the Toronto set and set up their makeup effects lab next to the mall.

Since the filmmakers had decided that the zombies in the film would become more decomposed over time, Anderson accordingly researched on the appearance of decay following human death, looking through several medical books, war footages, and crime scene photographs showing graphic images of trauma victims in order to properly depict this appearance; he broke down the look of decomposition into three stages:

The first stage looks like someone who was just in the ER – pale, with lots of fresh blood. The second stage has moist wounds but the skin is beginning to break down. There is a lot of discoloration and mottling, mostly blues and greens. The third stage is the most intense, with the skeletal form coming through. The wounds are dried-up, the skin is sloughing off and colors are oily blacks.

Headshot effects were achieved through various methods, such as bullet hit squibs that were covered in prosthetic scalps and attached to the back of the actor's head to be detonated. Concerned about the risk thereof, Anderson developed an alternative method in which his team would attach wires to the scalps and yank them with a remote-controlled "air ratchet system", lending a similar gruesome effect as with the squibs sans potential harm.

Filming and post-production

Principal photography
Filming began on June 9, 2003, on location in various parts of Toronto, Ontario, Canada. Hundreds of zombie extras had to be constantly available for the entire shoot. To handle the volume of willing extras, Anderson and his team built a large "factory" where painted extras would stay put until they are spoken for by either the main or second unit film crew. They built various makeup rooms for the artists to work in: one consisted of camper trailers where they would apply detailed prosthetic makeups to extras playing "hero zombies", a special type of zombie; and the other consisted of tents where they would produce painted masks for extras playing background zombies. Extras playing foreground zombies were painted with plain palette makeups in Anderson's mall lab. The makeup artists were given his concept images to work on as references. According to Anderson and Heather Langenkamp, the most extras they ever had in a given day sat between 200–400, with a total of 3,000 makeups completed when filming ended on September 6, 2003.

Visual effects and title sequence

The visual effects for the film were provided by Canadian VFX studio Mr. X Inc., with its president Dennis Berardi serving as the film's co-VFX supervisor.

The production shot scenes for which Snyder wanted as many as 4,000 live-action zombies, which Berardi created rather as a combination of practical zombies and CG zombies which he built as 3D models with Autodesk Maya. One such scene involved tens of thousands of zombies at the mall's parking lot, which was shot with motion-control passes whose green screen elements of 200 extras, combined with the CG zombies, were later composited to create a "digital crowd simulation that looks realistic".

Kyle Cooper designed the title sequence for the film, using real human blood.

Music
The score for Dawn of the Dead was composed by Tyler Bates, his first for a horror film. Bates became involved with the film after he was recommended to it by its music supervisor, G. Marq Roswell, who learned he made little money from his work on Mario Van Peebles's film Baadasssss! (2003), on which Roswell also served as music supervisor. The studio was not convinced with hiring Bates because they felt he was not an established composer at the time, but director Zack Snyder insisted on him, and he was ultimately hired.

In scoring the film, Bates avoided taking cues from the original's music by the band Goblin, finding its style to be incompatible with what Snyder had filmed. Bates's score combines elements of electronic music and 20th-century orchestra, which was influenced by the works of composers adept at creating dissonance, such as Béla Bartók and Krzysztof Penderecki. Bates employed these musical choices with the intention of making the audience "very, very uncomfortable".

Milan Records released Bates's score in physical format for the first time on October 23, 2012, a week after the record label released it digitally via iTunes Store and Amazon Music. The album comprises 31 tracks, all of which were composed by Bates. Bates's work on Dawn of the Dead also marked the beginning of a frequent collaboration between him and Snyder; he would later compose for the director on 300 (2006), Watchmen (2009), and Sucker Punch (2011).

Release

Box office

Dawn of the Dead was marketed with its 10-minute opening sequence that was broadcast on cable television four nights before its theatrical release. Released on March 19, 2004, the film grossed $26.7 million in its United States opening weekend, claiming the No. 1 spot The Passion of the Christ formerly held for three consecutive weekends. Dawn of the Dead ended its theatrical run grossing $102.3 million worldwide (against a budget of $26 million), with a gross of $59 million in the United States and Canada and $43.3 million in other territories. Variety reported, "Some 63% of Dawn [audiences] were under age 25, with 57% of patrons male. Hispanic moviegoers comprised 21% of its supporters and African-Americans 14%."

The release of Dawn of the Dead in the U.S. nearly coincided with that of Shaun of the Dead, another zombie film distributed by Universal Pictures. In a February 2004 Variety report, a spokesman at Universal revealed that the studio had greenlit Shaun of the Dead "with the condition that Dawn of the Dead would be released here in the U.S. first" in order to avoid this conflict.

Dawn of the Dead was screened out of competition at the 2004 Cannes Film Festival.

Home media
Universal Pictures Home Entertainment released Dawn of the Dead on DVD, Blu-ray, and digital with director Zack Snyder's unrated director's cut of the film, which Snyder described as longer, gorier, and more character-driven than the theatrical version. Bonus features found on the DVD and Blu-ray are Snyder and co-producer Eric Newman's audio commentary; the featurettes Attack of the Living Dead, Raising the Dead, Drawing the Dead, Splitting Headaches, Surviving the Dawn, and Andy's Lost Tape; deleted scenes with optional commentary with Snyder and Newman; and the film's theatrical trailer.

On Halloween of 2017, Shout! Factory's horror sub-label Scream Factory released a two-disc collector's edition Blu-ray of Dawn of the Dead, which contains the film's theatrical version and the director's cut. The Blu-ray, which is said to have been "derived from the digital intermediate archival negative", contains bonus features found in previous releases in addition to new and exclusive ones featuring interviews with actors Ty Burrell and Jake Weber, screenwriter James Gunn, and makeup effects artists David LeRoy Anderson and Heather Langenkamp. A 4K Ultra HD collector's edition Blu-ray from Scream Factory with extras ported over from the label's previous release was released on January 31, 2023.

Reception

Theatrical
 
Dawn of the Dead garnered strong reviews upon its release, with critics praising it as a worthy remake of the original as well as a decent entry in the zombie genre. Lisa Schwarzbaum praised Zack Snyder's direction in a "killer feature debut", and Roger Ebert gave it a positive review and said that anyone paying to see it is guaranteed to get their money's worth. Abundant praise was also given to the film's opening sequence; an otherwise negative review from The Hollywood Reporter called it "pulse-poundingly good". While some said the film exuded better acting, production values, and scares than the original, others felt its horror was not on par with that of the latter film. Another criticism was the lack of dark humor of the original, although many found the scene in which a couple of male characters shoot zombified celebrity look-alikes with a sniper rifle to be funny, among other jokes; The Hollywood Reporter cited it as some of the film's "moments of inspired audacity".

Despite the general praise, some critics felt the film had downplayed key elements of its predecessor. Ebert and Variety argued that whereas George A. Romero had exploited the shopping mall location to satirize consumer culture and a range of sociopolitical issues, Snyder had used it merely as a convenient setting for his characters. The Hollywood Reporter and Chicago Tribune complained that the film was content to indulge in bloody zombie killings at the expense of any nuance that was once present in the original, leaving the audience rather numbed and "less mercifully handled, even at the end-credits". In contrast, Manohla Dargis opined that Romero's consumerist metaphor has lost its significance in the years since the original's release, "with the politics of consumption now an established academic field and shopping now considered a statement of identity", and attributed the film's appeal not to its bloody violence "but [to] the filmmakers' commitment to genre fundamentals". IGN praised the film's tonal shift, calling it a "calculated risk that paid off". 

While Schwarzbaum and Dargis complimented James Gunn's script as "sharp" and propulsive, respectively, others took issue with what they believed to be a lack of plot and character developments. The Chicago Tribune thought the characters were clichéd and about as dumb as the undead, though sympathized with the "tragic" dilemma faced by Mekhi Phifer's character. Conversely, James Berardinelli said that although there were moments in which the characters did show a lack of common sense, "it's inevitable that most of them end up as one-dimensional throw-aways whose sole purpose is to increase the body count", and that "not many people go to a horror film looking for character development and drama". Likewise, Ebert was personally not on board with the characters' "risky" plan to escape from the mall in lieu of awaiting the zombies' natural death, though remarked that "taking chances makes for good action scenes". Both Ebert and Berardinelli found the subplots of the Phifer and Ving Rhames characters to be "touching", with the latter critic saying that these were "handled with a deft hand". 

Among the cast, which was praised as "superlative" and "respectable", Sarah Polley garnered the most attention from critics such as Schwarzbaum and the Chicago Tribune: she was described as a "perfect against-type heroine" with a "nice anxious stare". IGN was dismayed that least attention was given to Phifer's "naturally charismatic presence" with such a large cast, though felt that Rhames was effective as Polley's "quietly authoritative foil" and praised Jake Weber's performance in a "thankless role".

  Audiences polled by CinemaScore gave the film an average grade of "B" on an A+ to F scale.

Retrospective
In 2005, George A. Romero spoke briefly of how dissatisfied he was with Dawn of the Dead during an interview with actor Simon Pegg for Time Out. Romero said that although the remake could pass for a good action film, he felt it was aimless and "more of a video game" for that matter, as well as maintained that he was "not terrified of things running at me".

Numerous publications have named Dawn of the Dead as Zack Snyder's best film. Revisiting the film on its 15th anniversary in 2019, Joe Lipsett wrote the following verdict for Bloody Disgusting:

Fifteen years later, Dawn of the Dead completely holds up. The film's flaws are mostly at the character level, though having a dumb zombie baby and a few undeveloped red shirts in the mix is hardly a deal breaker. The action – particularly the opening scene and the propane explosion climax – in addition to the fantastic special effects makeup, the brief flirtation with found footage, and the reverence for its source text while introducing something new makes 2004's Dawn of the Dead one of the best remakes on the market.

Likewise, Dawn of the Dead has appeared on several lists of the top zombie films, including number 3 by Rolling Stone (2012), number 12 by Empire (2020),  by Collider (2021), and number 17 by IndieWire (2022); as well as the best horror films of the decade, including number 3 by Dread Central (2010), number 8 by Bloody Disgusting (2009), number 52 by IGN, and number 55 by Rolling Stone (2020). The film made review-aggregation website Rotten Tomatoes's lists of "The 20 Scariest Opening Scenes in Horror Movie History" (at number 6), "The 25 Best Horror Movie Remakes" (at number 9), "The 30 Essential Zombie Movies" (at number 13), and "18 Memorable Horror Remakes".

In a June 2018 article for The Hollywood Reporter, Richard Newby opined that Dawn of the Dead helped revitalize the zombie genre along with 28 Days Later at a time when the United States "was ripe for the re-emergence of zombie movies" following the September 11 attacks, which he believes to have contributed to Americans' "increased fear of biological weapons, fervent mass militarization and the burrowing question of who exactly are the people we call our neighbors". Likewise, author Stephen King, in the forenote of the 2010 edition of his book Danse Macabre, saw what he believed to be Snyder's subtext conveying the horrors induced by terrorist attacks, drawing parallels between the zombie apocalypse and a post-9/11 America. King described Dawn of the Dead as "genius perfected" in terms of its standing in the zombie genre.  South Park creators Trey Parker and Matt Stone and South Korean filmmaker Yeon Sang-ho consider themselves to be fans of the film, and cited it as an influence upon their works "Night of the Living Homeless" and the Train to Busan series, respectively.

Accolades

Spiritual successor

On March 25, 2007, Variety announced that Warner Bros. Pictures would produce a new zombie film from a screenplay written by Joby Harold, based on an original idea conceived by Snyder. In a statement, Snyder said that he wanted the film to feel similar to Dawn of the Dead and 300 and that it would center around a father in Las Vegas "who tries to save his daughter from imminent death in a zombie-infested world". At the time, Wesley Coller was attached to executive produce, with Snyder and his wife Deborah Snyder producing through Cruel & Unusual Films (now known as The Stone Quarry). Snyder got the idea during Dawn of the Deads production and wanted to explore a new evolution of the zombies. The film is not a sequel to Dawn of the Dead but rather a spiritual successor. Snyder realized that he needed a new origin story to develop the plot and create a new incarnation of the living dead. He titled the project Army of the Dead as a tribute to the works of George A. Romero. After languishing for several years in development hell, the distribution rights to the film were acquired by Netflix in 2019, and Snyder began shooting that same year. 

Army of the Dead had a week-long limited theatrical release starting May 14 prior to its wider Netflix release on May 21, 2021.

See also
List of American films of 2004
List of zombie films
 Night of the Living Dead (1990 film): a remake of Romero's 1968 film of the same name

Notes

References

Cited works

External links

 

2004 films
2004 action films
2004 directorial debut films
2004 horror films
2000s action horror films
2000s American films
2000s English-language films
American zombie films
American action horror films
American remakes of Italian films
Apocalyptic films
Films directed by Zack Snyder
Films produced by Marc Abraham
Films scored by Tyler Bates
Films set in 2004
Films set in Milwaukee
Films set in shopping malls
Films shot in Toronto
Films with screenplays by James Gunn
Horror film remakes
Living Dead films
Remakes of American films
Universal Pictures films